In number theory, an average order of an arithmetic function is some simpler or better-understood function which takes the same values "on average".

Let  be an arithmetic function.

as  tends to infinity.

It is conventional to choose an approximating function  that is continuous and monotone. But even so an average order is of course not unique.

In cases where the limit

exists, it is said that  has a mean value (average value) .

Examples
 The prime number theorem is equivalent to the statement that the von Mangoldt function  has average order 1;

Calculating mean values using Dirichlet series
In case  is of the form

for some arithmetic function , one has,

Generalizations of the previous identity are found here. This identity often provides a practical way to calculate the mean value in terms of the Riemann zeta function. This is illustrated in the following example.

The density of the k-th power free integers in 
For an integer  the set  of k-th-power-free integers is

The function  is multiplicative, and since it is bounded by 1, its Dirichlet series converges absolutely in the half-plane , and there has Euler product

By the Möbius inversion formula, we get

where  stands for the Möbius function. Equivalently,

where 
and hence,

By comparing the coefficients, we get

Using , we get

We conclude that,

where for this we used the relation

which follows from the Möbius inversion formula.

Visibility of lattice points
We say that two lattice points are visible from one another if there is no lattice point on the open line segment joining them.

Now, if , then writing a = da2, b = db2 one observes that the point (a2, b2) is on the line segment which joins (0,0) to (a, b) and hence (a, b) is not visible from the origin. Thus (a, b) is visible from the origin implies that (a, b) = 1. Conversely, it is also easy to see that gcd(a, b) = 1 implies that there is no other integer lattice point in the segment joining (0,0) to (a,b).
Thus, (a, b) is visible from (0,0) if and only if gcd(a, b) = 1.

Notice that  is the probability of a random point on the square  to be visible from the origin.

Thus, one can show that the natural density of the points which are visible from the origin is given by the average,

In fact, this is not a coincidence. Consider the k-dimensional lattice, .

Divisor functions
Consider the generalization of :

The following are true:

where .

Better average order

This notion is best discussed through an example. From

( is the Euler–Mascheroni constant) and

we have the asymptotic relation

Mean values over

Definition
Let h(x) be a function on the set of monic polynomials over Fq. For  we define

This is the mean value (average value) of h on the set of monic polynomials of degree n. We say that g(n) is an average order of h if

as n tends to infinity.

In cases where the limit,

exists, it is said that h has a mean value (average value) c.

Zeta function and Dirichlet series in 
Let  be the ring of polynomials over the finite field .

Let h be a polynomial arithmetic function (i.e. a function on set of monic polynomials over A). Its corresponding Dirichlet series define to be

The polynomial zeta function is then

where the product runs over all monic irreducible polynomials P.

For example, the product representation of the zeta function is as for the integers: .

Unlike the classical zeta function,  is a simple rational function:

In a similar way, If f and g are two polynomial arithmetic functions, one defines f * g, the Dirichlet convolution of f and g, by

where the sum extends over all monic divisors d of m, or equivalently over all pairs (a, b) of monic polynomials whose product is m. The identity  still holds. Thus, like in the elementary theory, the polynomial Dirichlet series and the zeta function has a connection with the notion of mean values in the context of polynomials. The following examples illustrate it.

Examples

The density of the k-th power free polynomials in 
Define  to be 1 if  is k-th power free and 0 otherwise.

By multiplicativity of :

Denote  the number of k-th power monic polynomials of degree n, we get

Making the substitution  we get:

Hence,

Polynomial Divisor functions
In , we define

First, notice that

Therefore,

Substitute  we get,
and by Cauchy product we get,

Finally we get that,

Notice that

Thus, if we set  then the above result reads

which resembles the analogous result for the integers:

Number of divisors

where .

Expanding the right-hand side into power series we get,

Substitute  the above equation becomes:
 which resembles closely the analogous result for integers , where  is Euler constant.

Not much is known about the error term for the integers, while in the polynomials case, there is no error term!
This is because of the very simple nature of the zeta function , and that it has NO zeros.

Polynomial von Mangoldt function
The Polynomial von Mangoldt function is defined by:

where the logarithm is taken on the basis of q.

Proposition.

Proof.
Let m be a monic polynomial, and let  be the prime decomposition of m.

We have,

Hence,

and we get that,

Now,

Thus,

We got that:

Now,

Hence,

and by dividing by  we get that,

Polynomial Euler totient function
Define Euler totient function polynomial analogue, to be the number of elements in the group . We have,

See also
 Divisor summatory function
 Normal order of an arithmetic function
 Extremal orders of an arithmetic function
 Divisor sum identities

References
   pp. 347–360
 
 
 

Arithmetic functions